The WE League Cup (Japanese: WEリーグカップ) is a cup competition for women's football clubs in Japan. Currently, there is only one edition of the tournament, and with its final scheduled to 1 October 2022.

Results

Records and statistics

Performances by club

Top scorers by year

See also
 Japan Football Association (JFA)
 WE League
 Empress's Cup (National Cup)
 Japanese association football league system

References

External links
WE League, weleague.jp 

Women's football in Japan
Sports leagues established in 2022
2022 establishments in Japan